Sabine Krantz (née Zimmer; born 6 February 1981) is a German race walker. She was born in Potsdam.

International competitions

References

External links 
  
 
 

1981 births
Living people
Sportspeople from Potsdam
German female racewalkers
German national athletics champions
Olympic athletes of Germany
Athletes (track and field) at the 2004 Summer Olympics
Athletes (track and field) at the 2008 Summer Olympics
Athletes (track and field) at the 2012 Summer Olympics
World Athletics Championships athletes for Germany
20th-century German women
21st-century German women